Das Andere Deutschland (German, "The Other Germany") was a weekly newspaper established in Germany in 1925 to advocate republican and pacifist causes until its forced closing by the Nazi-led government.

History
The newspaper stemmed from the monthly review the Pazifist, created in 1921. Both publications were administered by Fritz Küster. Das Andere Deutschland was the publication organ of the German Peace Society. During the Weimar Republic, Kurt Tucholsky, Erich Kästner, Heinrich Ströbel, Berthold Jacob, Carl Mertens, and Friedrich William Foerster, among others, wrote for the newspaper.

The newspaper was shut down on March 11, 1933, less than two weeks after Paul von Hindenburg approved the Reichstag Fire Decree written by the Adolf Hitler government.  Although it was initially supposed to be banned for three months, the Nazis' subsequent abrogation of remaining civil liberties kept it shuttered for the rest of the Nazi era. Küster was arrested and held in concentration camps from 1933 to 1938.

At the end of World War II, Küster resumed publication of the paper. In 1969, three years after Küster's death, the newspaper ran its final issue.

See also
Gleichschaltung
Nazi Germany

External links
German Peace Society - United War Objectors online

1925 establishments in Germany
1969 disestablishments in West Germany
Defunct newspapers published in Germany
Defunct weekly newspapers
German-language newspapers
Pacifism in Germany
Publications established in 1925
Publications disestablished in 1969
Weekly newspapers published in Germany